Neeli (born Neelofar) is a former Pakistani film actress who acted in both Urdu and Punjabi language films.

Early life and career
Neelofar was born on 24 June 1961 in Hyderabad, Pakistan. Neeli is a graduated from Saint Mary's Convent.

The director/producer Yunus Malik, a family friend, offered Neeli a role in a Punjabi film called Akhri Jang. Sangeeta signed her for a role in the Urdu film Kasam Munne Kee. After that film, Sajjad Gul signed her up in his films Choron Ki Barat  and Haseena 420. She starred in Madame Bavary in 1988 and had a double role in Kalay Chor. Later, she was paired with Javed Sheikh, and together they starred in  Sher Ali (1992), Khuda Gawah (1993), Mushkil (1995), Jeeva (1995), and Chief Saab (1996). Mushkil, dealing with the subject of child labour, was Sheikh's debut as director. After the decline of the Pakistani film industry in the early 2000s, Neeli gradually left the business.

Personal life
First she was married to Pakistani actor and film director Jawed Sheikh and got divorced. Later she married again and settled in Dubai.

Filmography

Films

Awards and nominations
Neeli won 7 Nigar Awards.
Nigar Award for Best Supporting Actress in film Qasam munney ki (1987)
Nigar Award for Best Actress in film Madam Bawari (1989)
Nigar Award for Best Actress in film Bakhtawar (1991)
Nigar Award for Best Actress in film Zamana (1993)
Nigar Award for Best Actress in film Aakhri mujra (1994)
Nigar Award for Best Supporting Actress in film Sakahi Badshah (1996)
Nigar Award for Best Actress in film Mard Jeenay Nahi Dete (1997)

See also 
 List of Lollywood actors

References

External links
 
 Actress Neeli on YouTube

1966 births
Living people
Sindhi people
Pakistani film actresses
Nigar Award winners
Actresses from Lahore
20th-century Pakistani actresses
21st-century Pakistani actresses
People from Hyderabad District, Pakistan
Actresses in Urdu cinema